Ets Hayim Synagogue is a synagogue in Cairo, Egypt. The Ets Hayim Synagogue, commonly known as the Temple Hanan (in French), and also known as the Hanan Synagogue, the Baroukh Hanan Synagogue or the Kenisset Hanan (كنسة حنان), was built in 1900. Various sources attribute the building of the synagogue to Baroukh or Hayim Hanan, or to both. According to one source, the synagogue was built by Ibrahim (Abraham) Hanan, and named after Baroukh Hanan.

The synagogue is located in the Ghamra neighborhood of Daher. Famous members of the Ets Hayim Synagogue included Egyptian-Jewish actress Nagwa Salem (born Ninette Shalom).

The Ets Hayim Synagogue has a religious school and a mikveh (Jewish ritual bath) although this is now falling into disrepair. Some of the marble flooring of the synagogue was damaged during the October 12, 1992 Cairo earthquake.

The synagogue is protected by the Egyptian Supreme Council of Antiquities, under Decree no. 2112 of 1973, and the synagogue is guarded by a policeman.

According to Canadian-American architectural photographer D.R. Cowles, the synagogue was last used was in 1967.

References

Synagogues in Cairo